Ernst Philipp Graf von Brunnow (31 August 1797, Dresden – 12 April 1875, Darmstadt) was a Baltic German diplomat who served in the Russian Empire.

Diplomatic roles

Brunnow represented Russia in several conferences, and held ambassadorial positions in London (1840–1854), Frankfurt (1855), Berlin (1856), and then returned to London (1858–1874).

Honours 
 Knight Grand Cross of the Legion of Honour. 
 Knight Grand Cross of the Order of Saint Stanislaus.
 Knight Grand Cross of the Order of the Red Eagle.
 Knight Grand Cross of the Order of the Netherlands Lion.
 Knight of the Order of the Gold Lion of the House of Nassau.
 Commander of the Order of St. Stephen of Hungary.
 Order of Saint Vladimir
 Order of Saint Anna
 Order of the White Eagle.
  Imperial Order of Saint Alexander Nevsky 
 Order of St. Andrew the Apostle the First-Called

References 

Diplomats of the Russian Empire
1797 births
1875 deaths
Ambassadors of the Russian Empire to the United Kingdom
Recipients of the Order of Saint Stanislaus (Russian)
Russian people of German descent
Ambassadors of the Russian Empire to France